Harborside station (formerly named Harborside Financial Center station) is a station on the Hudson–Bergen Light Rail (HBLR) located east of Greene Street, between Morgan and Steuben Streets, in Exchange Place section of Jersey City, New Jersey and named for the adjacent Harborside (Jersey City) office complex. There are two tracks and an island platform.

The station opened on November 18, 2000, and is served by the West Side–Tonnelle and 8th Street–Hoboken lines at all times and the Bayonne Flyer during the weekday rush.

In October 2017, New York Waterway initiated connecting ferry service at Harborside Financial Center.

Station layout

Gallery

References

External links

 North entrance from Google Maps Street View
 South entrance from Google Maps Street View
 Platform from Google Maps Street View

Hudson-Bergen Light Rail stations
Transportation in Jersey City, New Jersey
Railway stations in the United States opened in 2000
2000 establishments in New Jersey